Victoria McCloud is a British judge. She was the youngest Master in the High Court of England and Wales when she was appointed in 2006 as a deputy and then as a full judge in 2010. She is also a chartered psychologist and legal author.

Education 
McCloud graduated from Christ Church, Oxford in 1990 with a degree in Experimental Psychology and obtained a doctorate in 1993 in human visual system science. A year later, she completed a law conversion course and was called to the bar in 1995, where she practised under her maiden name of Victoria Williams.

Career 
McCloud had previously been a barrister at Coram Chambers. From 2006, she was a Deputy Costs Judge / Taxing Master. She was appointed a Queen's Bench Master in June 2010 and also re-appointed as a Costs Judge / Taxing Master in 2017.

McCloud wrote the first five editions of the Civil Procedure Handbook, the Surveillance and Intelligence Law Handbook for OUP (as Victoria Williams), and the White Book.

McCloud is a Master of the Senior Courts, Queen’s Bench Division. She was appointed in 2010. McCloud was the youngest ever Master in the High Court when appointed, and the second woman Master and the first trans person.

In 2016 McCloud began consulting with professionals working in the historic abuse field, hoping to improve the experience of justice for victims as well as for defendants and insurers. She set up the Historic Abuse Lawyers' forum (HALF) to look at the possibility of alternative approaches to trial and resolution. She has promoted the ideas that in the historic abuse field the court should try claims in a way that would minimize causing any further harm.

McCloud has presided over high-profile cases which have involved Donald Trump, Jeremy Corbyn, Katie Price, and Andrew Mitchell MP.

Other legal judicial decisions by her include asbestos related disease cases, such as Yates v HMRC, constitutional rights of access to justice and access to court proceedings, modern slavery, defamation law, equitable interpleader, and national security. Her decision in Warsama and Gannon v FCO and others considered UK constitutional issues under the Bill of Rights 1689, Parliamentary Privilege, free speech and human rights.

Personal life 
McCloud, who is also a chartered psychologist, authored (as Victoria Williams) an academic letter in 2003 to a Royal College of Psychiatry journal that considered standards of care for transgender people and highlighted errors in a paper published in the journal.

She lives in London with National Health Service psychiatrist Annie McCloud, who has been her civil partner since 2006.

References 

British women judges
Transgender women
1969 births
Living people
Members of Lincoln's Inn
Masters of the High Court (England and Wales)
21st-century English judges